Inis Lothair Claude, Jr. (1922 – December 23, 2013) was a leading scholar in international relations and international organizations. He held academic positions in several universities, including University of Virginia, Harvard University, University of Delaware & the University of Michigan.

Biography
Claude was born in Yell County, Arkansas and completed his BA at Hendrix College in 1942. He served in the US army between 1942 and 1946. Then, he entered Harvard University and completed MA and PhD in 1947 & 1949 respectively. In 1943, he married his college sweetheart Marie Stapleton and they had two daughters and a son. He spent his final years of his life at Westminster Canterbury of the Blue Ridge, VA. One of his most notable books was The Changing United Nations, published in 1967 based on lectures delivered at the Graduate Institute of International Studies in Geneva and the National University of Mexico.

Professorships
Claude taught at Harvard University before moving to University of Delaware in 1957. He taught at University of Michigan from 1958–1968, then at University of Virginia from 1969 until his retirement in 1988. He was also a visiting professor at the Institute of Social Studies in The Hague & Hebrew University in Jerusalem.

References

1922 births
2013 deaths
American political scientists
American political writers
International relations scholars
Harvard University alumni
People from Yell County, Arkansas
20th-century American non-fiction writers
University of Michigan faculty
Place of birth missing
University of Delaware faculty
20th-century American male writers
American male non-fiction writers
United States Army personnel of World War II